Canadian maritime law is based on the field of "Navigation and Shipping" vested in the Parliament of Canada by virtue of s. 91(10) of the Constitution Act, 1867.

Scope of jurisdiction

Canada has adopted an expansive definition of its maritime law, which goes beyond traditional admiralty law. The original English admiralty jurisdiction was called "wet", as it concerned itself with things done at sea, including collisions, salvage and the work of mariners, and contracts and torts performed at sea. Canadian law has added "dry" jurisdiction to this field, which includes such matters as:

 stevedoring,
 marine insurance,
 warehousing and security services,
 contracts of agency, and
 contracts of carriage.

This list is not exhaustive of the subject matter.

History

Canadian jurisdiction was originally consolidated in 1891, with subsequent expansions in 1934 following the passage of the Statute of Westminster 1931, and in 1971 with the extension to "dry" matters.

The scope of Canada's jurisdiction was crystallized in 1971 in legislation creating the Federal Court of Canada:

Canadian jurisprudence

This has been held by the Supreme Court of Canada, most recently in Ordon Estate v. Grail, to cover a very broad field:

This has had the effect of displacing many provincial statutes that were previously being used in maritime liability cases, and the implications are still being worked out.

In the 2006 case of Isen v Simms, the Court endorsed a summary given by Décary JA on what does not fall within federal jurisdiction:

The scope of maritime law has been refined by the SCC in subsequent jurisprudence:

 In 2012, in Tessier Ltée v. Quebec, it was declared that federal jurisdiction over shipping is not absolute, and must be construed in conjunction with the power to regulate works and undertakings, where the provinces are entitled to regulate transportation within their boundaries, while the federal government has jurisdiction over transportation that transcends provincial boundaries and connects the provinces with each other or with other countries.
 In 2013, in Marine Services International Ltd. v. Ryan Estate, Ordon'''s effect was restricted insofar as provincial jurisdiction may be affected by paramountcy and interjurisdictional immunity, as it was decided prior to the SCC's subsequent decisions on those fields in Canadian Western Bank and COPA''.

References

Relevant statutes

 Canada Marine Act (S.C. 1998, c. 10)
 Canada Shipping Act, 2001 (S.C. 2001, c. 26)
 Marine Insurance Act (S.C. 1993, c. 22)
 Marine Liability Act (S.C. 2001, c. 6)
 Pilotage Act (R.S.C., 1985, c. P-14)

Further reading

 
 
 
 
 
 

Admiralty law
Law of Canada